Chua Eng Kim (born c. 1924) was a Malaysian field hockey player. He competed in the men's tournament at the 1956 Summer Olympics. He was the brother of Malaysian hockey international Chuah Eng Cheng.

References

External links
 

1920s births
Possibly living people
Malaysian male field hockey players
Olympic field hockey players of Malaya
Field hockey players at the 1956 Summer Olympics
Place of birth missing (living people)
Malaysian sportspeople of Chinese descent